Michael C. Kasem (born August 24, 1973) is an American television presenter, actor, and radio DJ on Mediacorp Radio's Gold 905FM Live with Mike & Vernetta with co-host Vernetta Lopez.

Early life and family 
Born in Los Angeles County, California, Kasem is the son of the late American disc jockey and radio personality Casey Kasem and his first wife, Linda Myers. Kasem's sister is radio and television personality Kerri Kasem.

Kasem is married to Singaporean television presenter and former professional golfer Su Ann Heng since 2018 after three years of dating. They welcomed a baby boy, Casey Patrick Kasem, named after his grandfather, on June 25, 2020.

Career

Radio DJ
Mike Kasem started his Singapore radio career in 2011 when he joined Mediacorp Radio's Class 95FM co-hosting with Jean Danker. He later moved to Mediacorp Radio's Gold 905FM co-hosting the morning drive time show The Mike & Joe Xperiment with Joe Augustin. In 2016, Kasem paired with Vernetta Lopez to co-host the morning drive-time show Live with Mike & Vernetta on Gold 905FM.

Actor

Kasem made his film acting debut in 2014 in the feature film Afterimages, playing the character Harrison. Kasem also starred in the 2015 period drama movie 1965.

Television presenter

Kasem was an MTV VJ on MTV Asia from 1994 to 1999 hosting MTV's Most Wanted, among other shows. He has hosted/presented and acted in numerous TV show's for Mediacorp Channel 5 and is currently a full-time employee of Mediacorp in Singapore. Kasem along with former radio show co-host Jean Danker hosted the Singapore 2016 New Year's Eve Countdown Show.

References

External links

Toggle:Live with Mike & Vernetta

1973 births
Living people
American people of Lebanese descent
American people of Druze descent
American expatriates in Singapore
American radio personalities
People from Los Angeles County, California
Singaporean radio presenters